Bryan Craig Caldwell (May 6, 1960 – January 3, 2015) was an American football defensive end in the National Football League (NFL) for the Dallas Cowboys and Houston Oilers. He played college football at Arizona State University.

Early years
Caldwell attended Fountain Valley High School, where he was a two-way lineman and set a school record with 20 sacks in 2 years. He was considered one of the nation's top defensive recruits and received All-county honors. He also practiced track and volleyball. 

He accepted a football scholarship from Arizona State University and was named the starter at left defensive end as a freshman. He was moved to right defensive end as a sophomore, registering 111 total tackles (fourth on the team) and 5 fumble recoveries (school record). He also blocked a punt and returned it for a 46-yard touchdown against Ohio State University.

As a junior in 1981, he attended Mesa Community College to regain his academic eligibility and was replaced in the starting lineup with Walt Bowyer. 

As a senior in 1982, he returned to Arizona State University and was named the starter over Bowyer. He was a part of the number one ranked defense in the nation, known as the Cactus Crunch. He played alongside Jim Jeffcoat, Vernon Maxwell and Mike Richardson. He finished the year tied with Maxwell for the team lead in tackles-for-loss (8), fourth on the team in total tackles (114) and returned one interception for a 20-yard touchdown against Kansas State University.

Professional career

Dallas Cowboys
Caldwell was selected by the Dallas Cowboys in the third round (77th overall) of the 1983 NFL Draft. He was also selected by the Arizona Wranglers in the 1983 USFL Territorial Draft. He suffered torn knee ligaments in his left knee during the first week of training camp and was placed on the injured reserve list. He was released on August 27, 1984.

Houston Oilers
On September 20, 1984, he was signed as a free agent by the Houston Oilers to replace an injured Jerome Foster. He played in 8 games at defensive end, before being waived during the season.

Philadelphia Eagles
On May 8, 1985, he signed with the Philadelphia Eagles as a free agent and was waived on August 27.

Arizona Outlaws (USFL)
On January 6, 1986, he signed a one-year contract with the Arizona Outlaws of the United States Football League.

Personal life
Caldwell worked as an inspector for the city of Scottsdale, Arizona. He died of cancer in 2015.

References

1960 births
2015 deaths
Players of American football from Oakland, California
American football defensive ends
Arizona State Sun Devils football players
Mesa Community College alumni
Dallas Cowboys players
Houston Oilers players
Deaths from lymphoma
People from Fountain Valley, California